Armando Herrera (born May 25, 1955) is a retired male triple jumper from Cuba, who represented his native country twice at the Summer Olympics: 1976 and 1980. His best Olympic result was finishing in 11th place in Moscow, USSR (1980) with a leap of 16.03 meters. He was also the silver medallist in the event at the 1974 Central American and Caribbean Games. In 1983, Herrera retired from athletics.

Hardships

References

1955 births
Living people
Cuban male triple jumpers
Olympic athletes of Cuba
Athletes (track and field) at the 1975 Pan American Games
Athletes (track and field) at the 1976 Summer Olympics
Athletes (track and field) at the 1980 Summer Olympics
Central American and Caribbean Games medalists in athletics
Competitors at the 1974 Central American and Caribbean Games
Central American and Caribbean Games silver medalists for Cuba
Pan American Games competitors for Cuba
20th-century Cuban people
21st-century Cuban people